Nixchen is a 1920 German silent film directed by Paul Legband and starring Georg Alexander, Olga Engl and Ria Jende.

Cast
In alphabetical order
 Georg Alexander as Schriftsteller  
 Olga Engl 
 Ria Jende as Nixchen  
 Hans Mühlhofer 
 Ernst Stahl-Nachbaur as Herbert Gröndal

References

Bibliography
 Brian Keith-Smith. An encyclopedia of German women writers, 1900-1933. E. Mellen Press, 1998.

External links

1920 films
Films of the Weimar Republic
Films directed by Paul Legband
German silent feature films
German black-and-white films